The Laketown Dolomite is a dolomite geologic formation in Nevada and Utah. It preserves fossils dating back to the Silurian period.

See also 
 List of fossiliferous stratigraphic units in Nevada
 List of fossiliferous stratigraphic units in Utah
 Paleontology in Nevada
 Paleontology in Utah

References

Further reading 
 A. P. Gubanov, J.-O. R. Ebbestad, and P. Männik. 2017. The problematic mollusc Jinonicella from the Silurian of North America. Gff 139
 A. J. Boucot. 1999. Some Wenlockian-Geddinian, chiefly brachiopod dominated communities of North America. In A. J. Boucot, J. D. Lawson (eds.), Paleocommunities--a case study from the Silurian and Lower Devonian 549-591
 R. J. Elias. 1983. Late Ordovician solitary rugose corals of the Stony Mountain Formation, southern Manitoba, and its equivalents. Journal of Paleontology 57(5):924-956
 P. M. Sheehan. 1982. Late Ordovician and Silurian of the eastern Great Basin Part 4. Late Llandovery and Wenlock brachiopods. Milwaukee Public Museum Contributions in Biology and Geology 50:1-73
 P. M. Sheehan. 1980. The Late Ordovician and Silurian of the Eastern Great Basin, Part 3. Brachiopods of the Tony Grove Lake Member of the Laketown Dolomite. Milwaukee Public Museum Contributions in Biology and Geology 30:1-23

Silurian geology of Nevada
Silurian geology of Utah
Silurian System of North America
Dolomite formations
Deep marine deposits
Open marine deposits
Shallow marine deposits
Ordovician southern paleotropical deposits
Silurian southern paleotropical deposits
Paleontology in Nevada
Paleontology in Utah